The 2016 Jacksonville Dolphins football team represented Jacksonville University in the 2016 NCAA Division I FCS football season. They were led by first-year head coach Ian Shields and played their home games at D. B. Milne Field. They were members of the Pioneer Football League (PFL). They finished the season 5–5, 4–3 in PFL play to finish in fifth place.

Schedule

The game between Jacksonville and Campbell was cancelled in advance of the arrival of Hurricane Matthew.
Source: Schedule

Game summaries

at Liberty

Edward Waters

at Stetson

Duquesne

Campbell
This game was canceled due to Hurricane Matthew.

Dayton

at Morehead State

at Davidson

Drake

at Valparaiso

Marist

References

Jacksonville
Jacksonville Dolphins football seasons
Jacksonville Dolphins football